Francis Bugri (born 9 November 1980) is a German former professional footballer who played as a midfielder.

Club career
A Borussia Dortmund youth product, Bugri made four Bundesliga appearances with the club.

Personal life
Bugri is the son of a Ghanaian father and Romanian mother and was born in Eschwege.

Honours
Borussia Dortmund
Bundesliga: 2001–02
UEFA Cup Runner-up: 2001–02
Germany U16

 UEFA European Under-16 Championship third place: 1997

Filmography

Films

References

External links
 
 

1980 births
Living people
Association football midfielders
German footballers
Germany under-21 international footballers
Bundesliga players
Borussia Dortmund players
Borussia Dortmund II players
VfB Lübeck players
KSV Hessen Kassel players
Sportfreunde Lotte players
Kickers Emden players
SpVgg Erkenschwick players
Brabrand IF players
German sportspeople of Ghanaian descent
German people of Romanian descent
People from Eschwege
Sportspeople from Kassel (region)
Footballers from Hesse